Palmadusta saulae is a species of sea snail, a cowry, a marine gastropod mollusk in the family Cypraeidae, the cowries.

Description

Distribution

References

 Ma X.T. [Xiutong] (1997) Fauna Sinica. Phylum Mollusca. Class Gastropoda. Order Mesogastropoda. Superfamily Cypraeacea. Beijing: Science Press. 283 pp., 12 pls.
 Liu, J.Y. [Ruiyu] (ed.). (2008). Checklist of marine biota of China seas. China Science Press. 1267 pp. 

Cypraeidae
Gastropods described in 1843